A Nightmare (French: Le cauchemar) is a short silent trick film created and released in 1896 and directed by Georges Méliès. It was released by Méliès's Star Film Company and is numbered 82 in its catalogues, where it was advertised as a scène fantastique. The film was shot outside in the garden of Méliès's property in Montreuil, Seine-Saint-Denis, with painted scenery. Méliès plays the sleeping man.

Synopsis
A man attempting tosses and turns in his sleep, has a nightmare. He is visited by various visions which transform into each other, including a girl clad only in a sheet, a minstrel wearing blackface, Pierrot, and the Man in the Moon, who gnaws on his arm. He wakes up tangled in his sheets. He is relieved that it was all just a dream.

References

External links
 
 

1896 films
French silent short films
French black-and-white films
Films directed by Georges Méliès
Films about nightmares
Films shot in France
Blackface minstrel shows and films
Moon in film
1896 short films
Silent horror films
1890s French films